Zaw Wai Soe is a Burmese orthopaedics surgeon, physician, and professor who currently serves as the acting Union Minister for the Ministry of Labour, Immigration and Population, the Ministry of Education, and the Ministry of Health and Sports since 2 March 2021, appointed by the CRPH. He is the current Rector of the University of Medicine 1, Yangon since 20 May 2015 and previously served as Rector of the University of Medicine 2, Yangon from 2014 to 2015. He acts furthermore as the task force leader for reforming sixteen medical related universities in Myanmar.

Career
Zaw Wai Soe graduated with M.B.B.S from University of Medicine 2, Yangon  in 1986. Afterwards he served as a civil assistant surgeon for three years in Myingan District Hospital. After coming back from the United Kingdom in 2000, he worked in the Orthopaedic Department of Yangon General Hospital, Yangon Orthopaedic Hospital and was appointed as Rector of the University of Medicine 2, Yangon in 2014.

On 20 May 2015, Zaw was appointed as Rector of the University of Medicine 1, Yangon. He is one of the key founders of spine Surgery and Emergency Medicine in Myanmar.

In 2019, he  became the chairman of the Myanmar Rectors' Committee.

In 2020, he played a leading role in Yangon's COVID-19 fight and became the vice chair of Yangon Region COVID-19 Contain, Control and Treating Coordination Committee.

On 10 February 2021, in the aftermath of the 2021 Myanmar coup d'état, he was detained for two hours and questioned about his role in the movement.

On 2 March 2021, he was appointed by the Committee Representing Pyidaungsu Hluttaw as the acting Union Minister for the Ministry of Labour, Immigration and Population, the Ministry of Education, and the Ministry of Health and Sports in its cabinet.

On 5 March 2021, Zaw Wai Soe charged under section 505 of the penal code by the State Administration Council and announced that they prepare to charge Zaw Wai Soe under section 122 of the penal code for treason. The section 122 of the penal code carries a maximum penalty of death.

References

Living people
Burmese orthopaedic surgeons
University of Medicine 2, Yangon alumni
1962 births
People from Yangon